Baryssiniella is a genus of beetles in the family Cerambycidae, containing the following species:

 Baryssiniella hieroglyphica Berkov & Monne, 2010
 Baryssiniella tavakiliani Berkov & Monne, 2010

References

Acanthocinini